Matthew Nicolas Evans (born October 22, 1986) is a Filipino actor who rose to prominence after appearing in Filipino soap operas Komiks Presents: Da Adventures of Pedro Penduko, Tanging Yaman and Rosalka. Evans previously competed in Philippine reality television show Pinoy Big Brother: Teen Edition 1.

Personal life

Evans was born to father Thalmage Eugene Evans, an American citizen, and mother Vivien Mercado Nicolas, a Filipino. He has two half siblings. His biological father left his mother before he was born. His father was serving in the United States Air Force at that time. He eventually found out from his uncle that his biological father had died from a heart attack on June 10, 2010.

Evans has a daughter with former partner Johnelline Hickins (daughter of former '80s star, Coca Nicolas). On October 3, 2013, Evans married Katrina Fariñas, who belongs in a prominent political family in the Philippines. In 2014, they welcomed their first child. Evans also adopted Fariñas' son from a previous relationship. In 2015, Evans announced that they were expecting their second child together.

Legal trouble
Evans' former live-in partner Johnelline Hickins had him arrested and detained at a precinct jail in Pasig on October 21, 2012 after he allegedly hurt her and her brother during an altercation at their home, a day prior to his 26th birthday. Evans was released 2 days after on a ₱200 bail. The camp of Evans, however, denied that the actor inflicted any injury against his then-girlfriend and her brother. In a statement, Evans' legal counsel Gerly Rico said there was indeed an altercation among the three but denied that the actor injured Hickins and her brother, adding that Evans only fought back in self-defense.

Filmography

Television

Film

Awards and nominations

References

External links

1988 births
Living people
Star Magic
ABS-CBN personalities
GMA Network personalities
Participants in Philippine reality television series
Pinoy Big Brother contestants
Filipino people of American descent
People from Quezon City
Male actors from Metro Manila
21st-century Filipino male actors
Filipino male child actors
Filipino male television actors
Filipino Roman Catholics
Far Eastern University alumni